The Chronicle of Ramon Muntaner, written in Xirivella between 1325 and 1328, is the longest of the four great chronicles and narrates the facts from the birth of James I of Aragon (1207) to the coronation of Alfonso IV of Aragon (1328). His character of "mirror of princes" and "mirror of citizens" has been pointed out by all scholars.

He explains things that really happened and that he saw and lived. Muntaner often uses "I was there", which underlines his role as a witness, and provides data to help know the time of James I. The Catalan writer and investigator, Ferran Soldevila has been one of the main interpreters of the work of this medieval chronicler and his praise is quite eloquent.

Author 
Ramon Muntaner was born in Peralada in 1265. He was the son of a remarkable family that hosted Jaume I the Conqueror (in 1274, Jaume I went to the Second Council of Lyon and sojourned in the Castle of Peralada with Alfonso X the Wise of Castile). This fact, which occurred when he was nine years old, was one of his most precious memories and he mentions this event with emotion in the Chronicle. In the same way that in the European novelist tradition (for example, Chrétien de Troyes ), it is exposed to us, how the vision of a great hero in the eyes of a child is capable of changing the course of his life. Muntaner says that the vision of James I when he was a child led him to devote himself as a writer explaining everything he had seen.

In 1285, Peralada was destroyed by the Almogavars during the Crusade against the Crown of Aragon and he had to emigrate. When he was twenty, Ramon Muntaner took part in the conquest of Menorca. Later, he participated in the fight against the French during the War of Sicily, in 1300 at the Siege of Messina, next to Roger de Flor and as the administrator of his company. In the summer of 1302, he began under the orders of this leader, the expedition to the East. In 1307, he left the company, and in 1311 he married.

In 1315, he had to travel between Sicily and Roussillon, as he was in charge of a delicate mission: to transport from Catania to Perpignan an orphan baby, the future Jaume III of Mallorca, in order to deliver him to his grandparents. From that moment on, his memoirs were removed and matured for ten years, until he had a revealing "dream" that prompted him, in 1325, at the age of sixty, in Valencia, to start writing the Chronicle, which he finished three years later. Muntaner died on Ibiza in 1336.

Work 

Muntaner had a personal relationship with all the kings of the House of Aragon, the House of Mallorca and the House of Sicily belonging to the lineage of the Casal de Barcelona that were contemporary to him. In doing his work, he mainly resorted to historiographic texts for the reigns of James I and Peter the Great, and, from Alfons el Franc, his almost exclusive source is his own experience.

The work was written to be read aloud. Whenever he addresses his "listeners", he usually calls them "lords". Muntaner managed to establish a rapport with his "listeners". To do this, he uses joglaresque procedures (such as the question "What should I say?"), As well as using lively and colloquial language

The fundamental purpose of the work is to glorify the kings of the House of Aragon. The chronicler loyalty to the crown is closely related to providentialism and nationalism. The blood, a common fate and the language (the beautiful catalanesc of the world ) are the elements that make up the base of the Catalan and Aragonese community. It is impossible to find in the whole of medieval Europe anything that resembles the "national" maturity of the Chronicle

His life and adherence to the dynasty and the Catalan language, to which he expressed an extraordinary devotion, represent the counterweight to the centripetal forces within the Catalan national community resulting from the organization of conquered lands in new kingdoms (Mallorca, Valencia, Sicily) and, sometimes, the implantation of a new dynastic branch (Mallorca, Sicily). The awareness of the danger of division and the value of the union also explained it in his chronicle, especially in the example of the rush plant, "mata de jonc" in Catalan (Similar to the Sertorius horse tail example).

By virtue of this work, Ramón Muntaner also became the first author in the Catalan language to capture the aspirations of a large part of the Catalan elite for an Iberian political reunification, as he commented on Ariza's interview between the monarchs of the Crown of Aragon and the Crown of Castile, in which the latter proposed to Peter the Great an alliance between them, the king of Portugal and the king of Mallorca, Muntaner added: "... And, assuredly, he spoke the truth; if these four Kings of Spain whom he named, who are of one flesh and blood, held together, little need they fear all the other powers of the world..." (."..si aquests quatre reys que ell nomenava d'Espanya, qui són una carn e una sang, se teguessen ensemps, poch duptare tot laltre poder del món.").

Discrepancies between the Chronicle of Muntaner and that of Pachymeres 
Regarding the Catalan Company of the East, Ramon Muntaner began to write his chronicle in 1325, that is, 17 years after the Byzantine Greek George Pachymeres wrote his work De Michaele et Andronico Palæologis. While the work of Pachymeres offers the Greek vision of the facts, emphasizing the atrocities committed by the Company and Roger de Flor until 1308, the Chronicle of Ramon Muntaner is the only western source that relates the events in which the Catalan Company of the East took part. In some aspects, the work of Ramon Muntaner becomes, not only a glorification of Roger de Flor and the Company, but also a counter-narrative to the work of Pachymeres, narrating some facts that the Greek omits, and eluding explaining events that the Greek author does report in detail. Some of these events are:
 Massacre of the Genoese: Pachymeres claims that the massacre began as a result of a debt that Roger de Flor had not paid to the Genoese, while Muntaner fails to explain why the confrontations began.
 Battle of Germe: although it was a minor battle, Muntaner says nothing about it.
 Summary executions at Germe: Pachymeres calls Roger de Flor bloodthirsty because he wanted to execute the Greek soldiers who had surrendered the fortress to the Turks, accusing them of cowardice. Muntaner says nothing about it.
 Summary executions at Kula: Again, Pachymeres ecalls Roger de Flor bloodthirsty because he wanted to execute the Greek soldiers who had surrendered the fortress to the Turks, accusing them of cowardice. Muntaner says nothing about it.
 War contributions to Philadelphia: Pachymeres explains that, after releasing the city of Philadelphia, Roger de Flor levied illegal and unwarranted war tributes on the city. Muntaner says nothing about it.
 War tribute levied on Ephesus: Pachymeres narrates that after Bernat de Rocafort met with Roger de Flor in Ephesus, he committed all kinds of atrocities to exact payment of additional tribute. Muntaner says nothing about it.
 The Siege of Magnesia: Pachymeres narrates that the governor of Magnesia executed the almogavar garrison that protected the Company's treasure, seized it, and then withstood the siege that the Company laid on the city. Muntaner says nothing about it.
 Numbers: Muntaner's source for citing the number of armies, and of people killed, wounded and captured is unknown. Muntaner's numbers invariably favor Roger de Flor and the Catalan Company of the East.

Codex and editions 
Muntaner's work had great repercussions and diffusion during the fourteenth and fifteenth centuries, and was used, for example, in various passages of Tirant lo Blanc by Joanot Martorell. It was edited for the first time in the sixteenth century, coinciding with a time of great revision of historiography; This first edition was commissioned and paid by the jurors of the city of Valencia. New printed editions took place during the 19th century, during the period of romantic exaltation of the European medieval past, even a translation into English made by the Hakluyt Society in 1920-21

Codex 
 Codex, 1325/1332: Codex A / Ms. K.I.6 = COD K-I-6 / f.1 Real Biblioteca de San Lorenzo de El Escorial..
 Codex, 1342: Manuscript nº. 1803. National library of Spain.
 Codex, 1353: Manuscript. Ms. 4. Library of Catalonia (fragmented Codex, it only contains chapters 146 to 298).

Full editions 
 1st Edition, 1558. Valencia. Widow of Joan Mey Flandro: Chronicle or description of the acts and feats of the illustrious James (Jaume) the First, King of Aragon, Mallorca and Valencia, Count of Barcelona and Muntpesller, and many of his descendants. Done by the magnificent in Ramon Muntaner, who served said illustrious King Jaume and his children and descendants and was present at the events contained in the present history.
 2nd Edition, 1562. Barcelona. Jaume Cortey: Chronicle or description of the acts and feats of the illustrious James (Jaume) the First, King of Aragon, Mallorca and Valencia, Count of Barcelona and Muntpesller, and many of his descendants. Done by the magnificent in Ramon Muntaner, who served said illustrious King Jaume and his children and descendants and was present at the events contained in the present history..
 3rd Edition, 1844. Stuttgrat. Karl FW Lanz: Chronicle of the nobleman In Ramon Muntaner. 'Chronicle or description of the acts and feats of the illustrious King James (Jaume) the First and of many of his descendants.
 4th Edition, 1860. Barcelona. Antoni Bofarull: Catalan Chronicle by Ramon Muntaner.
 5th Edition, 1886. Barcelona. Josep Coroleu: Chronicle.
 6th Edition, 1927-1952. Barcelona. Josep Maria Casacuberta, and Miquel Coll i Alentorn. Ed. Barcino: Chronicle.
 7th Edition, 1971. Barcelona. Ferran Soldevila. Ed. Selecta: The Four Great Chronicles: Jaume I, Bernat Desclot, Ramon Muntaner, Pere III.
 8th Edition, 1973. Barcelona. JF Vidal-Jové and Bartomeu Bardagí. Ed. Selecta: Chronicle.
 9th Edition, 1979. Barcelona. Marina Gustà. Ediciones 62. (Reediciones del 1984, 1985, 1989, 1990, 1991, 1994 y 1998) : Crónica.
 10th Edition, 1999. Valencia. Vicent Josep Escartí.  Alfons el Magnànim Institution: Chronicle.
 Facsimile Edition 2006. Barcelona. Stefano Maria Cingolani : The Memory of the kings: the four great chronicles and Catalan historiography, from the 10th to the 14th century. (Facsimile edition of the four great chronicles from their first editions: that of Joan Mei for the Book of Events ("Llibre dels fets"), 1557, that of Sebastià Cormellas for the one of Bernat Desclot in 1616, that of Joan Mei de Ramon Muntaner also of 1557 and the Chronicles of Spain by Pere Marsili published in 1547 by Carles Amorós.)

Fragmentary editions 
 1850. Palma de Mallorca. Josep Maria Quadrado: Conquesta de Mallorca. (Conquest of Mallorca)
 1878. Nàpols. Enric Cardona: Crònica.(Chronicle)
 1879. Montpeller. Manuel Milà i Fontanals: Sermó (2a reedició 1881).
 1926. Barcelona. Lluís Nicolau d'Olwer: L'expedició dels catalans a Orient. (The expedition of the Catalans to the East)
 1932. Barcelona. Ramon Alòs-Moner: Crestomaties Barcino.
 1966. Barcelona. Ramon Sumoy: La croada de França contra els catalans.(The crusade of France against the Catalans.)

Complete translations and fragmentary translations  
s.XVI. Castilian. Miguel Monterde.
1827. French. Paris. J. A. C. Buchon.
1842. German. Leipzig. (Bilingüe alemany-català). Karl F. W. Lanz: Chronik des edlen En Ramon Muntaner. Chronica, o descripció dels fets, e hazanyes del inclyt Rey Don Iaume Primer e de molts de sos descendents.
1844. Italian. Florence. Filippo Moïsè.
 1921. English. London. Lady Goodenough. Ramon Muntaner Chronicle.
 1999. Italian. Nuoro. Giuseppe Meloni - Ramon Muntaner – Pietro IV of Aragona, The conquista della Sardegna nelle cronache catalane.

Some exonyms of the chronicle 
The links between the Crown of Aragon and other kingdoms and territories generated since the Middle Ages numerous exonyms that are nowadays almost forgotten, with the exception of Candia, now called Iraklion, on Crete. There follow some of the exonyms that appear in the Chroncle of Muntaner:
 , for Athens, capital of Greece
 , for Thebes, city of Greece
 , for Pylos (also known as Navarino), city of Greece
 , for Thasos, a Greek island
 , for Santiago de Compostela, capital of Galicia, Spain
 , for Seville, capital of Andalucia, Spain
 , for Siracusa, city of Sicily, Italy
 , for Sciacca, city of Sicily, Italy
 , for Siena, city of Italy
 , for Florence, city of Italy
 , for Gozo, an island of Malta
 , for Patras, city of Greece
 , for Cephalonia, island of Greece
 , for Corfu, island of Greece
 , for Brindisi, city of Italy
 , for Otranto, city of Italy
 , current Heraklion, city of Crete

See also 
 Ramon Muntaner
 Catalan Company
 History of the sword
 The four great chronicles
 Book of the facts of James I
 Chronicle of Bernat Desclot
 Chronicle of Pere Terç

References

External links 
 Manuscript of the Chronicle of Ramon Muntaner on line.
 On-line version (readable).
 Chronicle of Ramón Muntaner, translated to the English for Lady Goodenough.
 Work edited of Ramon Muntaner.
 Francisco of Moncada, Expedition of the Catalans and Aragoneses against Turkish and Greeks, 1623.

1320s books
14th-century history books
Crown of Aragon
Iberian chronicles
Catalan Company